Malwarebytes (formerly Malwarebytes Anti-Malware, abbreviated as MBAM) is an anti-malware software for Microsoft Windows, macOS, ChromeOS, Android, and iOS that finds and removes malware. Made by Malwarebytes Corporation, it was first released in January 2006. It is available in a free version, which scans for and removes malware when started manually, and a paid version, which additionally provides scheduled scans, real-time protection and a flash-memory scanner.

Overview
Malwarebytes is primarily a scanner that scans and removes malicious software, including rogue security software, adware, and spyware. Malwarebytes scans in batch mode, rather than scanning all files opened, reducing interference if another on-demand anti-malware software is also running on the computer.

Malwarebytes is available in both a free and a paid version. The free version can be run manually by the user when desired, whereas the paid version can perform scheduled scans, automatically scan files when opened, block IP addresses of malicious web sites, and scan only those services, programs and device drivers that are currently in use.

Security vulnerabilities
On February 2, 2016, Project Zero discovered four vulnerabilities in the Malwarebytes flagship product, including lack of server-side encryption for update files and lack of proper payload signing within encrypted data; the combination of which allowed an attacker to recompile the encrypted payload with exploits. Malwarebytes responded one day before disclosure in a blog article detailing the extreme difficulty in executing these attacks, as well as revealing that the announced server-side and encryption issues were resolved within days of private disclosure and were not outstanding at the time Project Zero published their research. Malwarebytes also published information on how to protect current users until a patch was released. This event also resulted in the establishment of a formal bug bounty program by Malwarebytes, which offers up to $1000 per disclosure , depending on severity and exploitability.

Dispute with IObit
On November 2, 2009, Malwarebytes accused IObit, a Chinese company that offers similar products, of incorporating the database of Malwarebytes Anti-Malware (and several products from other vendors, which were not named) into its security software IObit Security 360. IObit denied the accusation and stated that the database is based on user submissions, and sometimes the same signature names that are in Malwarebytes get placed into the results. They said that they did not have time to filter out the signature names that are similar to Malwarebytes. IObit also stated that Malwarebytes did not have convincing proof, and declared that the databases were not stolen. After the declaration from IObit, Malwarebytes replied that they are not convinced of the argument from IObit. Malwarebytes claims to have served DMCA infringement notices against CNET, Download.com and Majorgeeks in order to have the download sites remove the IObit software. IObit said that as of version 1.3, their database has been updated to address those accusations of intellectual property theft made earlier by Malwarebytes.

See also
 Comparison of computer viruses
 Internet security

References

External links

Antivirus software
Spyware removal
Android (operating system) software
Shareware
Windows security software
Software that uses Qt
Proprietary software that uses Qt
Security software
MacOS security software